Spargo is a surname. Notable people with the surname include:

Bob Spargo Sr. (1919-1994), Australian rules footballer
Bob Spargo (born 1939), Australian rules footballer
Charlie Spargo (born 1999), Australian rules footballer
John Spargo (1876–1966), British political writer and socialist
John Spargo (water polo) (born 1931) American water polo player
Paul Spargo (born 1966), Australian rules footballer
Ricky Spargo (born 1947), Australian rules footballer
Stephen Spargo (1903–1972), English footballer
Thomas J. Spargo, American former judge
Tony Sbarbaro (1897–1969), American jazz drummer

Fictional characters
Harry Spargo and his wife Beryl, characters in the television series Upstairs Downstairs

Other
Spargo (band), a Dutch disco-funk-band

See also
Lower Spargo and Upper Spargo, hamlets in Cornwall, county in South West England